Compsodrillia bicarinata is a species of sea snail, a marine gastropod mollusk in the family Pseudomelatomidae, the turrids and allies.

Description
The length of the shell attains 52.2 mm, its diameter 15.7 mm.

Distribution
This marine species occurs in the Gulf of California.

References

External links
 Boyko, Christopher B., and James R. Cordeiro. "Catalog of Recent type specimens in the Division of Invertebrate Zoology, American Museum of Natural History. V. Mollusca, part 2 (class Gastropoda [exclusive of Opisthobranchia and Pulmonata], with supplements to Gastropoda [Opisthobranchia], and Bivalvia)." Bulletin of the American Museum of Natural History (2001): 1–170
 Olsson, Axel A. "Biological Results of the University of Miami Deep-Sea Expeditions. 77. Mollusks from the Gulf of Panama Collected by R/V John Elliott Pillsbury, 1967." Bulletin of Marine Science 21.1 (1971): 35–92
 
 

bicarinata
Gastropods described in 1961